This is a list of the bird species recorded in Nepal. The avifauna of Nepal include a total of 915 species recorded, of which one is endemic, and one has been introduced by humans. 42 species are globally threatened.

This list's taxonomic treatment (designation and sequence of orders, families and species) and nomenclature (common and scientific names) follow the conventions of The Clements Checklist of Birds of the World, 2022 edition. The family accounts at the beginning of each heading reflect this taxonomy, as do the species counts found in each family account. Introduced and accidental species are included in the total counts for Nepal.

The following tags have been used to highlight several categories. The commonly occurring native species do not fall into any of these categories.

(A) Accidental - a species that rarely or accidentally occurs in Nepal
(E) Endemic - a species endemic to Nepal
 (Ex) Extirpated - a species that no longer occurs in Nepal although populations exist elsewhere
(I) Introduced - a species introduced to Nepal as a consequence, direct or indirect, of human actions

Ducks, geese, and waterfowl
Order: AnseriformesFamily: Anatidae

Anatidae includes the ducks and most duck-like waterfowl, such as geese and swans. These birds are adapted to an aquatic existence with webbed feet, flattened bills, and feathers that are excellent at shedding water due to an oily coating.

Fulvous whistling-duck, Dendrocygna bicolor (A)
Lesser whistling-duck, Dendrocygna javanica
Bar-headed goose, Anser indicus
Graylag goose, Anser anser
Greater white-fronted goose, Anser albifrons (A)
Taiga bean-goose, Anser fabalis (A)
Tundra swan, Cygnus columbianus (A)
Whooper swan, Cygnus cygnus (A)
Knob-billed duck, Sarkidiornis melanotos
Ruddy shelduck, Tadorna ferruginea
Common shelduck, Tadorna tadorna
Cotton pygmy-goose, Nettapus coromandelianus
Mandarin duck, Aix galericulata (A)
Baikal teal, Sibirionetta formosa (A)
Garganey, Spatula querquedula
Northern shoveler, Spatula clypeata
Gadwall, Mareca strepera
Falcated duck, Mareca falcata
Eurasian wigeon, Mareca penelope
Indian spot-billed duck, Anas poecilorhyncha
Eastern spot-billed duck, Anas zonorhyncha (A)
Mallard, Anas platyrhynchos
Northern pintail, Anas acuta
Green-winged teal, Anas crecca
Pink-headed duck, Rhodonessa caryophyllacea (A)(Ex)
Red-crested pochard, Netta rufina
Common pochard, Aythya ferina
Ferruginous duck, Aythya nyroca
Baer's pochard, Aythya baeri (A)
Tufted duck, Aythya fuligula
Greater scaup, Aythya marila (A)
Harlequin duck, Histrionicus histrionicus (A)
Long-tailed duck, Clangula hyemalis (A)
Common goldeneye, Bucephala clangula
Smew, Mergellus albellus (A)
Common merganser, Mergus merganser
Red-breasted merganser, Mergus serrator (A)

Pheasants, grouse, and allies
Order: GalliformesFamily: Phasianidae

The Phasianidae are a family of terrestrial birds. In general, they are plump (although they vary in size) and have broad, relatively short wings.

Hill partridge, Arborophila torqueola
Rufous-throated partridge, Arborophila rufogularis
Indian peafowl, Pavo cristatus
Red spurfowl, Galloperdix spadicea (A)
Blue-breasted quail, Synoicus chinensis
Common quail, Coturnix coturnix
Rain quail, Coturnix coromandelica (A)
Chukar, Alectoris chukar
Tibetan snowcock, Tetraogallus tibetanus
Himalayan snowcock, Tetraogallus himalayensis
Jungle bush-quail, Perdicula asiatica (A)
Black francolin, Francolinus francolinus
Gray francolin, Ortygornis pondicerianus
Swamp francolin, Ortygornis gularis
Red junglefowl, Gallus gallus
Blood pheasant, Ithaginis cruentus
Himalayan monal, Lophophorus impejanus
Snow partridge, Lerwa lerwa
Satyr tragopan, Tragopan satyra
Cheer pheasant, Catreus wallichii
Kalij pheasant, Lophura leucomelanos
Tibetan partridge, Perdix hodgsoniae
Koklass pheasant, Pucrasia macrolopha

Flamingos
Order: PhoenicopteriformesFamily: Phoenicopteridae

Flamingos filter-feed on shellfish and algae. Their oddly shaped beaks are specially adapted to separate mud and silt from the food they consume and, uniquely, are used upside-down.

Greater flamingo, Phoenicopterus roseus (A)

Grebes
Order: PodicipediformesFamily: Podicipedidae

Grebes are small to medium-large freshwater diving birds. They have lobed toes and are excellent swimmers and divers. However, they have their feet placed far back on the body, making them quite ungainly on land.

Little grebe, Tachybaptus ruficollis
Great crested grebe, Podiceps cristatus
Eared grebe, Podiceps nigricollis

Pigeons and doves
Order: ColumbiformesFamily: Columbidae

Pigeons and doves are stout-bodied birds with short necks and short slender bills with a fleshy cere.

Rock pigeon, Columba livia
Hill pigeon, Columba rupestris
Snow pigeon, Columba leuconota
Common wood-pigeon, Columba palumbus (A)
Speckled wood-pigeon, Columba hodgsonii
Ashy wood-pigeon, Columba pulchricollis
Oriental turtle-dove, Streptopelia orientalis
Eurasian collared-dove, Streptopelia decaocto
Red collared-dove, Streptopelia tranquebarica
Spotted dove, Spilopelia chinensis
Laughing dove, Spilopelia senegalensis
Barred cuckoo-dove, Macropygia unchall
Asian emerald dove, Chalcophaps indica
Orange-breasted green-pigeon, Treron bicincta
Ashy-headed green-pigeon, Treron phayrei
Thick-billed green-pigeon, Treron curvirostra
Yellow-footed green-pigeon, Treron phoenicoptera
Pin-tailed green-pigeon, Treron apicauda
Wedge-tailed green-pigeon, Treron sphenura
Green imperial-pigeon, Ducula aenea
Mountain imperial-pigeon, Ducula badia

Sandgrouse
Order: PterocliformesFamily: Pteroclidae

Sandgrouse have small, pigeon like heads and necks, but sturdy compact bodies. They have long pointed wings and sometimes tails and a fast direct flight. Flocks fly to watering holes at dawn and dusk. Their legs are feathered down to the toes.

Tibetan sandgrouse, Syrrhaptes tibetanus (A)

Bustards
Order: GruiformesFamily: Otididae

Bustards are large terrestrial birds mainly associated with dry open country and steppes in the Old World. They are omnivorous and nest on the ground. They walk steadily on strong legs and big toes, pecking for food as they go. They have long broad wings with "fingered" wingtips and striking patterns in flight. Many have interesting mating displays.

Bengal florican, Houbaropsis bengalensis
Lesser florican, Sypheotides indicus

Cuckoos
Order: CuculiformesFamily: Cuculidae

The family Cuculidae includes cuckoos, roadrunners and anis. These birds are of variable size with slender bodies, long tails and strong legs. The Old World cuckoos are brood parasites.

Greater coucal, Centropus sinensis
Lesser coucal, Centropus bengalensis
Sirkeer malkoha, Taccocua leschenaultii
Green-billed malkoha, Phaenicophaeus tristis
Chestnut-winged cuckoo, Clamator coromandus
Pied cuckoo, Clamator jacobinus
Asian koel, Eudynamys scolopacea
Asian emerald cuckoo, Chrysococcyx maculatus
Banded bay cuckoo, Cacomantis sonneratii
Plaintive cuckoo, Cacomantis merulinus (A)
Gray-bellied cuckoo, Cacomantis passerinus
Fork-tailed drongo-cuckoo, Surniculus dicruroides
Square-tailed drongo-cuckoo, Surniculus lugubris
Large hawk-cuckoo, Hierococcyx sparverioides
Common hawk-cuckoo, Hierococcyx varius
Hodgson's hawk-cuckoo, Hierococcyx nisicolor (A)
Lesser cuckoo, Cuculus poliocephalus
Indian cuckoo, Cuculus micropterus
Himalayan cuckoo, Cuculus saturatus
Common cuckoo, Cuculus canorus
Oriental cuckoo, Cuculus optatus

Nightjars and allies
Order: CaprimulgiformesFamily: Caprimulgidae

Nightjars are medium-sized nocturnal birds that usually nest on the ground. They have long wings, short legs and very short bills. Most have small feet, of little use for walking, and long pointed wings. Their soft plumage is camouflaged to resemble bark or leaves.

Gray nightjar, Caprimulgus jotaka
Sykes's nightjar, Caprimulgus mahrattensis (A)
Large-tailed nightjar, Caprimulgus macrurus
Indian nightjar, Caprimulgus asiaticus
Savanna nightjar, Caprimulgus affinis

Swifts
Order: CaprimulgiformesFamily: Apodidae

Swifts are small birds which spend the majority of their lives flying. These birds have very short legs and never settle voluntarily on the ground, perching instead only on vertical surfaces. Many swifts have long swept-back wings which resemble a crescent or boomerang.

White-rumped needletail, Zoonavena sylvatica
White-throated needletail, Hirundapus caudacutus
Silver-backed needletail, Hirundapus cochinchinensis
Himalayan swiftlet, Aerodramus brevirostris
Alpine swift, Apus melba
Common swift, Apus apus
Pacific swift, Apus pacificus
Blyth's swift, Apus leuconyx
Little swift, Apus affinis
House swift, Apus nipalensis
Asian palm-swift, Cypsiurus balasiensis

Treeswifts
Order: CaprimulgiformesFamily: Hemiprocnidae

The treeswifts, also called crested swifts, are closely related to the true swifts. They differ from the other swifts in that they have crests, long forked tails and softer plumage.

Crested treeswift, Hemiprocne coronata

Rails, gallinules, and coots
Order: GruiformesFamily: Rallidae

Rallidae is a large family of small to medium-sized birds which includes the rails, crakes, coots and gallinules. Typically they inhabit dense vegetation in damp environments near lakes, swamps or rivers. In general they are shy and secretive birds, making them difficult to observe. Most species have strong legs and long toes which are well adapted to soft uneven surfaces. They tend to have short, rounded wings and to be weak fliers.

Water rail, Rallus aquaticus (A)
Brown-cheeked rail, Rallus indicus
Slaty-breasted rail, Lewinia striata (A)
Spotted crake, Porzana porzana (A)
Eurasian moorhen, Gallinula chloropus
Eurasian coot, Fulica atra
Gray-headed swamphen, Porphyrio poliocephalus
Watercock, Gallicrex cinerea
White-breasted waterhen, Amaurornis phoenicurus
Slaty-legged crake, Rallina eurizonoides (A)
Ruddy-breasted crake, Zapornia fusca
Brown crake, Zapornia akool
Baillon's crake, Zapornia pusilla
Black-tailed crake, Zapornia bicolor (A)

Cranes
Order: GruiformesFamily: Gruidae

Cranes are large, long-legged and long-necked birds. Unlike the similar-looking but unrelated herons, cranes fly with necks outstretched, not pulled back. Most have elaborate and noisy courting displays or "dances".

Demoiselle crane, Anthropoides virgo
Sarus crane, Antigone antigone
Common crane, Grus grus
Black-necked crane, Grus nigricollis (A)

Thick-knees
Order: CharadriiformesFamily: Burhinidae

The thick-knees are a group of largely tropical waders in the family Burhinidae. They are found worldwide within the tropical zone, with some species also breeding in temperate Europe and Australia. They are medium to large waders with strong black or yellow-black bills, large yellow eyes and cryptic plumage. Despite being classed as waders, most species have a preference for arid or semi-arid habitats.

Indian thick-knee, Burhinus indicus
Great thick-knee, Esacus recurvirostris

Stilts and avocets
Order: CharadriiformesFamily: Recurvirostridae

Recurvirostridae is a family of large wading birds, which includes the avocets and stilts. The avocets have long legs and long up-curved bills. The stilts have extremely long legs and long, thin, straight bills.

Black-winged stilt, Himantopus himantopus
Pied avocet, Recurvirostra avosetta

Ibisbill
Order: CharadriiformesFamily: Ibidorhynchidae

The ibisbill is related to the waders, but is sufficiently distinctive to be a family unto itself. The adult is gray with a white belly, red legs, a long down curved bill, and a black face and breast band.

Ibisbill, Ibidorhyncha struthersii

Oystercatchers
Order: CharadriiformesFamily: Haematopodidae

The oystercatchers are large and noisy plover-like birds, with strong bills used for smashing or prising open molluscs. There are 11 species worldwide and 1 species which occurs in Nepal.

Eurasian oystercatcher, Haematopus ostralegus (A)

Plovers and lapwings
Order: CharadriiformesFamily: Charadriidae

The family Charadriidae includes the plovers, dotterels and lapwings. They are small to medium-sized birds with compact bodies, short, thick necks and long, usually pointed, wings. They are found in open country worldwide, mostly in habitats near water.

Black-bellied plover, Pluvialis squatarola (A)
Pacific golden-plover, Pluvialis fulva
Northern lapwing, Vanellus vanellus
River lapwing, Vanellus duvaucelii
Yellow-wattled lapwing, Vanellus malabaricus
Gray-headed lapwing, Vanellus cinereus
Red-wattled lapwing, Vanellus indicus
White-tailed lapwing, Vanellus leucurus
Lesser sand-plover, Charadrius mongolus
Greater sand-plover, Charadrius leschenaultii (A)
Kentish plover, Charadrius alexandrinus
Common ringed plover, Charadrius hiaticula (A)
Long-billed plover, Charadrius placidus
Little ringed plover, Charadrius dubius

Painted-snipes
Order: CharadriiformesFamily: Rostratulidae

Painted-snipes are short-legged, long-billed birds similar in shape to the true snipes, but more brightly colored.

Greater painted-snipe, Rostratula benghalensis

Jacanas
Order: CharadriiformesFamily: Jacanidae

The jacanas are a group of tropical waders in the family Jacanidae. They are found throughout the tropics. They are identifiable by their huge feet and claws which enable them to walk on floating vegetation in the shallow lakes that are their preferred habitat.

Pheasant-tailed jacana, Hydrophasianus chirurgus
Bronze-winged jacana, Metopidius indicus

Sandpipers and allies
Order: CharadriiformesFamily: Scolopacidae

Scolopacidae is a large diverse family of small to medium-sized shorebirds including the sandpipers, curlews, godwits, shanks, tattlers, woodcocks, snipes, dowitchers and phalaropes. The majority of these species eat small invertebrates picked out of the mud or soil. Variation in length of legs and bills enables multiple species to feed in the same habitat, particularly on the coast, without direct competition for food.

Whimbrel, Numenius phaeopus
Eurasian curlew, Numenius arquata
Black-tailed godwit, Limosa limosa
Ruddy turnstone, Arenaria interpres (A)
Ruff, Calidris pugnax
Curlew sandpiper, Calidris ferruginea
Temminck's stint, Calidris temminckii
Long-toed stint, Calidris subminuta (A)
Sanderling, Calidris alba (A)
Dunlin, Calidris alpina
Little stint, Calidris minuta
Jack snipe, Lymnocryptes minimus
Eurasian woodcock, Scolopax rusticola
Solitary snipe, Gallinago solitaria
Wood snipe, Gallinago nemoricola
Common snipe, Gallinago gallinago
Pin-tailed snipe, Gallinago stenura
Swinhoe's snipe, Gallinago megala (A)
Terek sandpiper, Xenus cinereus (A)
Red-necked phalarope, Phalaropus lobatus (A)
Common sandpiper, Actitis hypoleucos
Green sandpiper, Tringa ochropus
Spotted redshank, Tringa erythropus
Common greenshank, Tringa nebularia
Marsh sandpiper, Tringa stagnatilis
Wood sandpiper, Tringa glareola
Common redshank, Tringa totanus

Buttonquail
Order: CharadriiformesFamily: Turnicidae

The buttonquail are small, drab, running birds which resemble the true quails. The female is the brighter of the sexes and initiates courtship. The male incubates the eggs and tends the young.

Small buttonquail, Turnix sylvatica
Yellow-legged buttonquail, Turnix tanki
Barred buttonquail, Turnix suscitator

Pratincoles and coursers
Order: CharadriiformesFamily: Glareolidae

Glareolidae is a family of wading birds comprising the pratincoles, which have short legs, long pointed wings and long forked tails, and the coursers, which have long legs, short wings and long, pointed bills which curve downwards.

Indian courser, Cursorius coromandelicus
Collared pratincole, Glareola pratincola (A)
Oriental pratincole, Glareola maldivarum
Small pratincole, Glareola lactea

Gulls, terns, and skimmers
Order: CharadriiformesFamily: Laridae

Laridae is a family of medium to large seabirds, the gulls, terns, and skimmers. Gulls are typically gray or white, often with black markings on the head or wings. They have stout, longish bills and webbed feet. Terns are a group of generally medium to large seabirds typically with gray or white plumage, often with black markings on the head. Most terns hunt fish by diving but some pick insects off the surface of fresh water. Terns are generally long-lived birds, with several species known to live in excess of 30 years. Skimmers are a small family of tropical tern-like birds. They have an elongated lower mandible which they use to feed by flying low over the water surface and skimming the water for small fish.

Slender-billed gull, Chroicocephalus genei
Black-headed gull, Chroicocephalus ridibundus
Brown-headed gull, Chroicocephalus brunnicephalus
Pallas's gull, Ichthyaetus ichthyaetus
Common gull, Larus canus (A)
Herring gull, Larus argentatus (A)
Caspian gull, Larus cachinnans (A)
Sooty tern, Onychoprion fuscatus (A)
Lesser black-backed gull, Larus fuscus (A)
Little tern, Sternula albifrons
Gull-billed tern, Gelochelidon nilotica
Caspian tern, Hydroprogne caspia
White-winged tern, Chlidonias leucopterus
Whiskered tern, Chlidonias hybrida
Common tern, Sterna hirundo
Black-bellied tern, Sterna acuticauda
River tern, Sterna aurantia
Indian skimmer, Rynchops albicollis

Loons
Order: GaviiformesFamily: Gaviidae

Loons, known as divers in Europe, are a group of aquatic birds found in many parts of North America and northern Europe. They are the size of a large duck or small goose, which they somewhat resemble when swimming, but to which they are completely unrelated.

Red-throated loon, Gavia stellata (A)

Storks
Order: CiconiiformesFamily: Ciconiidae

Storks are large, long-legged, long-necked, wading birds with long, stout bills. Storks are mute, but bill-clattering is an important mode of communication at the nest. Their nests can be large and may be reused for many years. Many species are migratory.

Asian openbill, Anastomus oscitans
Black stork, Ciconia nigra
Asian woolly-necked stork, Ciconia episcopus
White stork, Ciconia ciconia
Black-necked stork, Ephippiorhynchus asiaticus
Lesser adjutant, Leptoptilos javanicus
Greater adjutant, Leptoptilos dubius (A)
Painted stork, Mycteria leucocephala

Anhingas
Order: SuliformesFamily: Anhingidae

Anhingas or darters are often called "snake-birds" because of their long thin neck, which gives a snake-like appearance when they swim with their bodies submerged. The males have black and dark-brown plumage, an erectile crest on the nape and a larger bill than the female. The females have much paler plumage especially on the neck and underparts. The darters have completely webbed feet and their legs are short and set far back on the body. Their plumage is somewhat permeable, like that of cormorants, and they spread their wings to dry after diving.

Oriental darter, Anhinga melanogaster'

Cormorants and shags
Order: SuliformesFamily: Phalacrocoracidae

Phalacrocoracidae is a family of medium to large coastal, fish-eating seabirds that includes cormorants and shags. Plumage coloration varies, with the majority having mainly dark plumage, some species being black-and-white and a few being colorful.

Little cormorant, Microcarbo nigerGreat cormorant, Phalacrocorax carboIndian cormorant, Phalacrocorax fuscicollis (A)

Pelicans
Order: PelecaniformesFamily: Pelecanidae

Pelicans are large water birds with a distinctive pouch under their beak. As with other members of the order Pelecaniformes, they have webbed feet with four toes.

Great white pelican, Pelecanus onocrotalus (A)
Spot-billed pelican, Pelecanus philippensisHerons, egrets, and bitterns
Order: CiconiiformesFamily: Ardeidae

The family Ardeidae contains the bitterns, herons and egrets. Herons and egrets are medium to large wading birds with long necks and legs. Bitterns tend to be shorter necked and more wary. Members of Ardeidae fly with their necks retracted, unlike other long-necked birds such as storks, ibises and spoonbills.

Great bittern, Botaurus stellarisYellow bittern, Ixobrychus sinensisLittle bittern, Ixobrychus minutusCinnamon bittern, Ixobrychus cinnamomeusBlack bittern, Ixobrychus flavicollisGray heron, Ardea cinereaWhite-bellied heron, Ardea insignis (Ex)
Purple heron, Ardea purpureaGreat egret, Ardea albaIntermediate egret, Ardea intermediaLittle egret, Egretta garzettaCattle egret, Bubulcus ibisWhite-faced heron, Egretta novaehollandiaeIndian pond-heron, Ardeola grayiiChinese pond-heron, Ardeola bacchus(A) 
Striated heron, Butorides striataBlack-crowned night-heron, Nycticorax nycticoraxMalayan night-heron, Gorsachius melanolophus (A)

Ibises and spoonbills
Order: CiconiiformesFamily: Threskiornithidae

Threskiornithidae is a family of large terrestrial and wading birds which includes the ibises and spoonbills. They have long, broad wings with 11 primary and about 20 secondary feathers. They are strong fliers and despite their size and weight, very capable soarers.

Glossy ibis, Plegadis falcinellus (A)
Black-headed ibis, Threskiornis melanocephalusRed-naped ibis, Pseudibis papillosaEurasian spoonbill, Platalea leucorodiaOsprey
Order: AccipitriformesFamily: Pandionidae

The family Pandionidae contains only one species, the osprey. The osprey is a medium-large raptor which is a specialist fish-eater with a worldwide distribution.

Osprey, Pandion haliaetusHawks, eagles, and kites
Order: AccipitriformesFamily: Accipitridae

Accipitridae is a family of birds of prey, which includes hawks, eagles, kites, harriers and Old World vultures. These birds have powerful hooked beaks for tearing flesh from their prey, strong legs, powerful talons and keen eyesight.

Black-winged kite, Elanus caeruleusBearded vulture, Gypaetus barbatusEgyptian vulture, Neophron percnopterusOriental honey-buzzard, Pernis ptilorhynchusJerdon's baza, Aviceda jerdoni (A)
Black baza, Aviceda leuphotesRed-headed vulture, Sarcogyps calvusCinereous vulture, Aegypius monachusWhite-rumped vulture, Gyps bengalensisIndian vulture, Gyps indicus (A)
Slender-billed vulture, Gyps tenuirostrisHimalayan griffon, Gyps himalayensisEurasian griffon, Gyps fulvusCrested serpent-eagle, Spilornis cheelaShort-toed snake-eagle, Circaetus gallicusChangeable hawk-eagle, Nisaetus cirrhatusMountain hawk-eagle, Nisaetus nipalensisRufous-bellied eagle, Lophotriorchis kieneriiBlack eagle, Ictinaetus malaiensisIndian spotted eagle, Clanga hastataGreater spotted eagle, Clanga clangaBooted eagle, Hieraaetus pennatusTawny eagle, Aquila rapaxSteppe eagle, Aquila nipalensisImperial eagle, Aquila heliacaGolden eagle, Aquila chrysaetosBonelli's eagle, Aquila fasciataWhite-eyed buzzard, Butastur teesaEurasian marsh-harrier, Circus aeruginosusEastern marsh-harrier, Circus spilonotusHen harrier, Circus cyaneusPallid harrier, Circus macrourusPied harrier, Circus melanoleucosMontagu's harrier, Circus pygargusCrested goshawk, Accipiter trivirgatusShikra, Accipiter badiusBesra, Accipiter virgatusEurasian sparrowhawk, Accipiter nisusNorthern goshawk, Accipiter gentilisRed kite, Milvus milvus (A)
Black kite, Milvus migransBrahminy kite, Haliastur indusWhite-tailed eagle, Haliaeetus albicillaPallas's fish-eagle, Haliaeetus leucoryphusLesser fish-eagle, Ichthyophaga humilisGray-headed fish-eagle, Ichthyophaga ichthyaetusCommon buzzard, Buteo buteoHimalayan buzzard, Buteo refectusEastern buzzard, Buteo japonicusLong-legged buzzard, Buteo rufinusUpland buzzard, Buteo hemilasiusBarn owls
Order: StrigiformesFamily: Tytonidae

Barn owls are medium to large owls with large heads and characteristic heart-shaped faces. They have long strong legs with powerful talons.

Australasian grass-owl, Tyto longimembrisBarn owl, Tyto albaOwls
Order: StrigiformesFamily: Strigidae

The typical owls are small to large solitary nocturnal birds of prey. They have large forward-facing eyes and ears, a hawk-like beak and a conspicuous circle of feathers around each eye called a facial disk.

Mountain scops-owl, Otus spilocephalusIndian scops-owl, Otus bakkamoenaCollared scops-owl, Otus lettiaOriental scops-owl, Otus suniaEurasian eagle-owl, Bubo buboRock eagle-owl, Bubo bengalensisSpot-bellied eagle-owl, Bubo nipalensisDusky eagle-owl, Bubo coromandusBrown fish-owl, Ketupa zeylonensisTawny fish-owl, Ketupa flavipesCollared owlet, Taenioptynx brodieiAsian barred owlet, Glaucidium cuculoidesJungle owlet, Glaucidium radiatumSpotted owlet, Athene bramaLittle owl, Athene noctuaMottled wood-owl, Strix ocellata (A)
Brown wood-owl, Strix leptogrammicaTawny owl, Strix alucoHimalayan owl, Strix nivicolumLong-eared owl, Asio otus (A)
Short-eared owl, Asio flammeusBrown boobook, Ninox scutulataTrogons
Order: TrogoniformesFamily: Trogonidae

The family Trogonidae includes trogons and quetzals. Found in tropical woodlands worldwide, they feed on insects and fruit, and their broad bills and weak legs reflect their diet and arboreal habits. Although their flight is fast, they are reluctant to fly any distance. Trogons have soft, often colorful, feathers with distinctive male and female plumage.

Red-headed trogon, Harpactes erythrocephalusHoopoes
Order: CoraciiformesFamily: Upupidae

Hoopoes have black, white and orangey-pink coloring with a large erectile crest on their head.

Eurasian hoopoe, Upupa epopsHornbills
Order: BucerotiformesFamily: Bucerotidae

Hornbills are a group of birds whose bill is shaped like a cow's horn, but without a twist, sometimes with a casque on the upper mandible. Frequently, the bill is brightly colored.

Great hornbill, Buceros bicornisIndian gray hornbill, Ocyceros birostrisOriental pied hornbill, Anthracoceros albirostrisRufous-necked hornbill, Aceros nipalensis (Ex)

Kingfishers
Order: CoraciiformesFamily: Alcedinidae

Kingfishers are medium-sized birds with large heads, long, pointed bills, short legs and stubby tails.

Blyth's kingfisher, Alcedo hercules (A)
Common kingfisher, Alcedo atthisBlue-eared kingfisher, Alcedo menintingBlack-backed kingfisher, Ceyx erithacus (A)
Stork-billed kingfisher, Pelargopsis capensisRuddy kingfisher, Halcyon coromandaWhite-throated kingfisher, Halcyon smyrnensisBlack-capped kingfisher, Halcyon pileata (A)
Crested kingfisher, Megaceryle lugubrisPied kingfisher, Ceryle rudisBee-eaters
Order: CoraciiformesFamily: Meropidae

The bee-eaters are a group of near passerine birds in the family Meropidae. Most species are found in Africa but others occur in southern Europe, Madagascar, Australia and New Guinea. They have richly colored plumage, slender bodies and usually elongated central tail feathers. All are colorful and have long downturned bills and pointed wings, which give them a swallow-like appearance when seen from afar.

Blue-bearded bee-eater, Nyctyornis athertoniAsian green bee-eater, Merops orientalisBlue-tailed bee-eater, Merops philippinusChestnut-headed bee-eater, Merops leschenaultiRollers
Order: CoraciiformesFamily: Coraciidae

Rollers resemble crows in size and build, but are more closely related to the kingfishers and bee-eaters. They share the colorful appearance of those groups with blues and browns predominating. The two inner front toes are connected, but the outer toe is not.

Indian roller, Coracias benghalensisIndochinese roller, Coracias affinisDollarbird, Eurystomus orientalisAsian barbets
Order: PiciformesFamily: Megalaimidae

The Asian barbets are plump birds, with short necks and large heads. They get their name from the bristles which fringe their heavy bills. Most species are brightly coloured.

Coppersmith barbet, Psilopogon haemacephalusBlue-eared barbet, Psilopogon duvauceliiGreat barbet, Psilopogon virensLineated barbet, Psilopogon lineatusBrown-headed barbet, Psilopogon zeylanicusGolden-throated barbet, Psilopogon frankliniiBlue-throated barbet, Psilopogon asiaticusHoneyguides
Order: PiciformesFamily: Indicatoridae

Honeyguides are among the few birds that feed on wax. They are named for the greater honeyguide which leads traditional honey-hunters to bees' nests and, after the hunters have harvested the honey, feeds on the remaining contents of the hive.

Yellow-rumped honeyguide, Indicator xanthonotusWoodpeckers
Order: PiciformesFamily: Picidae

Woodpeckers are small to medium-sized birds with chisel-like beaks, short legs, stiff tails and long tongues used for capturing insects. Some species have feet with two toes pointing forward and two backward, while several species have only three toes. Many woodpeckers have the habit of tapping noisily on tree trunks with their beaks.

Eurasian wryneck, Jynx torquillaSpeckled piculet, Picumnus innominatusWhite-browed piculet, Sasia ochraceaBrown-capped pygmy woodpecker, Yungipicus nanusGray-capped pygmy woodpecker, Yungipicus canicapillusYellow-crowned woodpecker, Leiopicus mahrattensisBrown-fronted woodpecker, Dendrocoptes auricepsRufous-bellied woodpecker, Dendrocopos hyperythrusFulvous-breasted woodpecker, Dendrocopos maceiDarjeeling woodpecker, Dendrocopos darjellensisHimalayan woodpecker, Dendrocopos himalayensisCrimson-breasted woodpecker, Dryobates cathphariusBay woodpecker, Blythipicus pyrrhotisGreater flameback, Chrysocolaptes guttacristatusWhite-naped woodpecker, Chrysocolaptes festivusRufous woodpecker, Micropternus brachyurusPale-headed woodpecker, Gecinulus grantiaHimalayan flameback, Dinopium shoriiBlack-rumped flameback, Dinopium benghalenseLesser yellownape, Picus chlorolophusStreak-throated woodpecker, Picus xanthopygaeusScaly-bellied woodpecker, Picus squamatusGray-headed woodpecker, Picus canusGreater yellownape, Chrysophlegma flavinuchaGreat slaty woodpecker, Mulleripicus pulverulentusFalcons and caracaras
Order: FalconiformesFamily: Falconidae

Falconidae is a family of diurnal birds of prey. They differ from hawks, eagles and kites in that they kill with their beaks instead of their talons.

Collared falconet, Microhierax caerulescensLesser kestrel, Falco naumanniEurasian kestrel, Falco tinnunculusRed-necked falcon, Falco chicqueraAmur falcon, Falco amurensisMerlin, Falco columbariusEurasian hobby, Falco subbuteoOriental hobby, Falco severusLaggar falcon, Falco juggerSaker falcon, Falco cherrugPeregrine falcon, Falco peregrinusOld World parrots
Order: PsittaciformesFamily: Psittaculidae

Characteristic features of parrots include a strong curved bill, an upright stance, strong legs, and clawed zygodactyl feet. Many parrots are vividly coloured, and some are multi-coloured. Old World parrots are found from Africa east across south and southeast Asia and Oceania to Australia and New Zealand.

Alexandrine parakeet, Psittacula eupatriaRose-ringed parakeet, Psittacula krameri (I)
Slaty-headed parakeet, Psittacula himalayanaGray-headed parakeet, Psittacula finschii (A)
Plum-headed parakeet, Psittacula cyanocephalaBlossom-headed parakeet, Psittacula roseataRed-breasted parakeet, Psittacula alexandriVernal hanging-parrot, Loriculus vernalisAsian and Grauer's broadbills 
Order: PasseriformesFamily: Eurylaimidae

The broadbills are small, brightly colored birds, which feed on fruit and also take insects in flycatcher fashion, snapping their broad bills. Their habitat is canopies of wet forests.

Long-tailed broadbill, Psarisomus dalhousiaeSilver-breasted broadbill, Serilophus lunatusPittas
Order: PasseriformesFamily: Pittidae

Pittas are medium-sized by passerine standards and are stocky, with fairly long, strong legs, short tails and stout bills. Many are brightly colored. They spend the majority of their time on wet forest floors, eating snails, insects and similar invertebrates.

Blue-naped pitta, Hydrornis nipalensisIndian pitta, Pitta brachyuraHooded pitta, Pitta sordidaCuckooshrikes
Order: PasseriformesFamily: Campephagidae

The cuckooshrikes are small to medium-sized passerine birds. They are predominantly grayish with white and black, although some species are brightly colored.

White-bellied minivet, Pericrocotus erythropygius (A)
Small minivet, Pericrocotus cinnamomeusGray-chinned minivet, Pericrocotus solarisShort-billed minivet, Pericrocotus brevirostrisLong-tailed minivet, Pericrocotus ethologusScarlet minivet, Pericrocotus flammeusAshy minivet, Pericrocotus divaricatus (A)
Brown-rumped minivet, Pericrocotus cantonensis (A)
Rosy minivet, Pericrocotus roseusLarge cuckooshrike, Coracina maceiBlack-winged cuckooshrike, Lalage melaschistosBlack-headed cuckooshrike, Lalage melanopteraVireos, shrike-babblers, and erpornis
Order: PasseriformesFamily: Vireonidae

Most of the members of this family are found in the New World. However, the shrike-babblers and erpornis, which only slightly resemble the "true" vireos and greenlets, are found in South East Asia.

Black-headed shrike-babbler, Pteruthius rufiventerWhite-browed shrike-babbler, Pteruthius aeralatusGreen shrike-babbler, Pteruthius xanthochlorusBlack-eared shrike-babbler, Pteruthius melanotisWhite-bellied erpornis, Erpornis zantholeucaOld World orioles
Order: PasseriformesFamily: Oriolidae

The Old World orioles are colorful passerine birds. They are not related to the New World orioles.

Indian golden oriole, Oriolus kundooBlack-naped oriole, Oriolus chinensis (A)
Slender-billed oriole, Oriolus tenuirostrisBlack-hooded oriole, Oriolus xanthornusMaroon oriole, Oriolus trailliiWoodswallows, bellmagpies, and allies
Order: PasseriformesFamily: Artamidae

The woodswallows are soft-plumaged, somber-colored passerine birds. They are smooth, agile flyers with moderately large, semi-triangular wings.

Ashy woodswallow, Artamus fuscusVangas, helmetshrikes, and allies
Order: PasseriformesFamily: Vangidae

The family Vangidae is highly variable, though most members of it resemble true shrikes to some degree.

Large woodshrike, Tephrodornis gularisCommon woodshrike, Tephrodornis pondicerianusBar-winged flycatcher-shrike, Hemipus picatusIoras
Order: PasseriformesFamily: Aegithinidae

The ioras are bulbul-like birds of open forest or thorn scrub, but whereas that group tends to be drab in coloration, ioras are sexually dimorphic, with the males being brightly plumaged in yellows and greens.

Common iora, Aegithina tiphiaFantails
Order: PasseriformesFamily: Rhipiduridae

The fantails are small insectivorous birds which are specialist aerial feeders.

White-throated fantail, Rhipidura albicollisWhite-browed fantail, Rhipidura aureolaDrongos
Order: PasseriformesFamily: Dicruridae

The drongos are mostly black or dark gray in color, sometimes with metallic tints. They have long forked tails, and some Asian species have elaborate tail decorations. They have short legs and sit very upright when perched, like a shrike. They flycatch or take prey from the ground.

Black drongo, Dicrurus macrocercusAshy drongo, Dicrurus leucophaeusWhite-bellied drongo, Dicrurus caerulescensCrow-billed drongo, Dicrurus annectensBronzed drongo, Dicrurus aeneusLesser racket-tailed drongo, Dicrurus remiferHair-crested drongo, Dicrurus hottentottusGreater racket-tailed drongo, Dicrurus paradiseusMonarch flycatchers
Order: PasseriformesFamily: Monarchidae

The monarch flycatchers are small to medium-sized insectivorous passerines which hunt by flycatching.

Black-naped monarch, Hypothymis azureaBlyth's paradise-flycatcher, Terpsiphone affinisIndian paradise-flycatcher, Terpsiphone paradisiShrikes
Order: PasseriformesFamily: Laniidae

Shrikes are passerine birds known for their habit of catching other birds and small animals and impaling the uneaten portions of their bodies on thorns. A typical shrike's beak is hooked, like a bird of prey.

Red-backed shrike, Lanius collurio (A)
Isabelline shrike, Lanius isabellinus (A)
Brown shrike, Lanius cristatusBay-backed shrike, Lanius vittatusLong-tailed shrike, Lanius schachGray-backed shrike, Lanius tephronotusGreat gray shrike, Lanius excubitorCrows, jays, and magpies
Order: PasseriformesFamily: Corvidae

The family Corvidae includes crows, ravens, jays, choughs, magpies, treepies, nutcrackers and ground jays. Corvids are above average in size among the Passeriformes, and some of the larger species show high levels of intelligence.

Eurasian jay, Garrulus glandariusBlack-headed jay, Garrulus lanceolatusYellow-billed blue-magpie, Urocissa flavirostrisRed-billed blue-magpie, Urocissa erythrorhynchaCommon green-magpie, Cissa chinensisRufous treepie, Dendrocitta vagabundaGray treepie, Dendrocitta formosaeEurasian magpie, Pica picaEurasian nutcracker, Nucifraga caryocatactesRed-billed chough, Pyrrhocorax pyrrhocoraxYellow-billed chough, Pyrrhocorax graculusEurasian jackdaw, Corvus monedula (A)
House crow, Corvus splendensLarge-billed crow, Corvus macrorhynchosCommon raven, Corvus coraxFairy flycatchers
Order: PasseriformesFamily: Stenostiridae

Most of the species of this small family are found in Africa, though a few inhabit tropical Asia. They are not closely related to other birds called "flycatchers".

Yellow-bellied fairy-fantail, Chelidorhynx hypoxanthusGray-headed canary-flycatcher, Culicicapa ceylonensisTits, chickadees, and titmice
Order: PasseriformesFamily: Paridae

The Paridae are mainly small stocky woodland species with short stout bills. Some have crests. They are adaptable birds, with a mixed diet including seeds and insects.

Fire-capped tit, Cephalopyrus flammicepsYellow-browed tit, Sylviparus modestusSultan tit, Melanochlora sultaneaCoal tit, Periparus aterRufous-naped tit, Periparus rufonuchalisRufous-vented tit, Periparus rubidiventrisGray-crested tit, Lophophanes dichrousWhite-browed tit, Poecile superciliosus (A)
Ground tit, Pseudopodoces humilisGreen-backed tit, Parus monticolusCinereous tit, Parus cinereusHimalayan black-lored tit, Parus xanthogenysYellow-cheeked tit, Parus spilonotusLarks
Order: PasseriformesFamily: Alaudidae

Larks are small terrestrial birds with often extravagant songs and display flights. Most larks are fairly dull in appearance. Their food is insects and seeds.

Rufous-tailed lark, Ammomanes phoenicura (A)
Ashy-crowned sparrow-lark, Eremopterix griseaHorsfield’s bushlark, Mirafra javanica (A)
Bengal bushlark, Mirafra assamicaIndian bushlark, Mirafra erythroptera (A)
Horned lark, Eremophila alpestrisGreater short-toed lark, Calandrella brachydactyla (A)
Mongolian short-toed lark, Calandrella dukhunensisHume's lark, Calandrella acutirostrisTibetan lark, Melanocorypha maxima (A)
Sand lark, Alaudala raytalEurasian skylark, Alauda arvensis (A)
Oriental skylark, Alauda gulgulaCrested lark, Galerida cristataCisticolas and allies
Order: PasseriformesFamily: Cisticolidae

The Cisticolidae are warblers found mainly in warmer southern regions of the Old World. They are generally very small birds of drab brown or gray appearance found in open country such as grassland or scrub.

Common tailorbird, Orthotomus sutoriusHimalayan prinia, Prinia crinigeraBlack-throated prinia, Prinia atrogularisGray-crowned prinia, Prinia cinereocapillaGray-breasted prinia, Prinia hodgsoniiDelicate prinia, Prinia lepidaJungle prinia, Prinia sylvaticaYellow-bellied prinia, Prinia flaviventrisAshy prinia, Prinia socialisPlain prinia, Prinia inornataZitting cisticola, Cisticola juncidisGolden-headed cisticola, Cisticola exilisReed warblers and allies
Order: PasseriformesFamily: Acrocephalidae

The members of this family are usually rather large for "warblers". Most are rather plain olivaceous brown above with much yellow to beige below. They are usually found in open woodland, reedbeds, or tall grass. The family occurs mostly in southern to western Eurasia and surroundings, but it also ranges far into the Pacific, with some species in Africa.

Thick-billed warbler, Arundinax aedonBooted warbler, Iduna caligataBlack-browed reed warbler, Acrocephalus bistrigiceps (A)
Paddyfield warbler, Acrocephalus agricolaBlunt-winged warbler, Acrocephalus concinens (A)
Blyth's reed warbler, Acrocephalus dumetorumOriental reed warbler, Acrocephalus orientalis (A)
Clamorous reed warbler, Acrocephalus stentoreusGrassbirds and allies
Order: PasseriformesFamily: Locustellidae

Locustellidae are a family of small insectivorous songbirds found mainly in Eurasia, Africa, and the Australian region. They are smallish birds with tails that are usually long and pointed, and tend to be drab brownish or buffy all over.

Striated grassbird, Megalurus palustrisPallas's grasshopper warbler, Helopsaltes certhiola (A)
Lanceolated warbler, Locustella lanceolata (A)
Brown bush warbler, Locustella luteoventris (Ex)
Chinese bush warbler, Locustella tacsanowskiaCommon grasshopper-warbler, Locustella naevia (A)
Baikal bush warbler, Locustella davidi (A)
West Himalayan bush warbler, Locustella kashmirensis (A)
Spotted bush warbler, Locustella thoracicaRusset bush warbler, Locustella mandelli 
Bristled grassbird, Schoenicola striatusCupwings
Order: PasseriformesFamily: Pnoepygidae

The members of this small family are found in mountainous parts of South and South East Asia.

Scaly-breasted cupwing, Pnoepyga albiventerImmaculate cupwing, Pnoepyga immaculata (E)
Pygmy cupwing, Pnoepyga pusillaSwallows
Order: PasseriformesFamily: Hirundinidae

The family Hirundinidae is adapted to aerial feeding. They have a slender streamlined body, long pointed wings and a short bill with a wide gape. The feet are adapted to perching rather than walking, and the front toes are partially joined at the base.

Gray-throated martin, Riparia chinensisBank swallow, Riparia ripariaPale sand martin, Riparia dilutaEurasian crag-martin, Ptyonoprogne rupestrisBarn swallow, Hirundo rusticaWire-tailed swallow, Hirundo smithiiRed-rumped swallow, Cecropis dauricaStreak-throated swallow, Petrochelidon fluvicolaCommon house-martin, Delichon urbica (A)
Asian house-martin, Delichon dasypusNepal house-martin, Delichon nipalensisBulbuls
Order: PasseriformesFamily: Pycnonotidae

Bulbuls are medium-sized songbirds. Some are colorful with yellow, red or orange vents, cheeks, throats or supercilia, but most are drab, with uniform olive-brown to black plumage. Some species have distinct crests.

Black-crested bulbul, Rubigula flaviventrisStriated bulbul, Pycnonotus striatusRed-vented bulbul, Pycnonotus caferRed-whiskered bulbul, Pycnonotus jocosusHimalayan bulbul, Pycnonotus leucogenysWhite-throated bulbul, Alophoixus flaveolusBlack bulbul, Hypsipetes leucocephalusAshy bulbul, Hemixos flavalaMountain bulbul, Ixos mcclellandiiLeaf warblers
Order: PasseriformesFamily: Phylloscopidae

Leaf warblers are a family of small insectivorous birds found mostly in Eurasia and ranging into Wallacea and Africa. The species are of various sizes, often green-plumaged above and yellow below, or more subdued with greyish-green to greyish-brown colours.

Ashy-throated warbler, Phylloscopus maculipennisBuff-barred warbler, Phylloscopus pulcherYellow-browed warbler, Phylloscopus inornatusHume's warbler, Phylloscopus humeiPallas's leaf warbler, Phylloscopus proregulusLemon-rumped warbler, Phylloscopus proregulusTytler's leaf warbler, Phylloscopus tytleri (A)
Radde's warbler, Phylloscopus schwarzi (A)
Sulphur-bellied warbler, Phylloscopus griseolusTickell's leaf warbler, Phylloscopus affinisDusky warbler, Phylloscopus fuscatusSmoky warbler, Phylloscopus fuligiventerBuff-throated warbler, Phylloscopus subaffinisMountain chiffchaff, Phylloscopus sindianusCommon chiffchaff, Phylloscopus collybitaEastern crowned warbler, Phylloscopus coronatusGray-cheeked warbler, Phylloscopus poliogenysGreen-crowned warbler, Phylloscopus burkiiWhistler's warbler, Phylloscopus whistleriGreen warbler, Phylloscopus nitidusGreenish warbler, Phylloscopus trochiloidesLarge-billed leaf warbler, Phylloscopus magnirostrisChestnut-crowned warbler, Phylloscopus castanicepsYellow-vented warbler, Phylloscopus cantatorWestern crowned warbler, Phylloscopus occipitalisBlyth's leaf warbler, Phylloscopus reguloidesGray-hooded warbler, Phylloscopus xanthoschistosBush warblers and allies
Order: PasseriformesFamily: Scotocercidae

The members of this family are found throughout Africa, Asia, and Polynesia. Their taxonomy is in flux, and some authorities place some genera in other families.

Pale-footed bush warbler, Urosphena pallidipesAsian stubtail, Urosphena squameiceps (A)
Gray-bellied tesia, Tesia cyaniventerSlaty-bellied tesia, Tesia oliveaChestnut-crowned bush warbler, Cettia majorGray-sided bush warbler, Cettia brunnifronsChestnut-headed tesia, Cettia castaneocoronataYellow-bellied warbler, Abroscopus superciliarisRufous-faced warbler, Abroscopus albogularisBlack-faced warbler, Abroscopus schisticepsMountain tailorbird, Phyllergates cucullatus (A)
Broad-billed warbler, Tickellia hodgsoniBrownish-flanked bush warbler, Horornis fortipesHume's bush warbler, Horornis brunnescensAberrant bush warbler, Horornis flavolivaceaLong-tailed tits
Order: PasseriformesFamily: Aegithalidae

Long-tailed tits are a group of small passerine birds with medium to long tails. They make woven bag nests in trees. Most eat a mixed diet which includes insects.

White-browed tit-warbler, Leptopoecile sophiaeBlack-throated tit, Aegithalos concinnusWhite-throated tit, Aegithalos niveogularisBlack-browed tit, Aegithalos iouschistosSylviid warblers, parrotbills, and allies
Order: PasseriformesFamily: Sylviidae

The family Sylviidae is a group of small insectivorous passerine birds. They mainly occur as breeding species, as the common name implies, in Europe, Asia and, to a lesser extent, Africa. Most are of generally undistinguished appearance, but many have distinctive songs.

Lesser whitethroat, Curruca currucaEastern Orphean warbler, Curruca crassirostris (A)
Fire-tailed myzornis, Myzornis pyrrhouraGolden-breasted fulvetta, Lioparus chrysotisYellow-eyed babbler, Chrysomma sinenseJerdon's babbler, Chrysomma altirostreWhite-browed fulvetta, Fulvetta vinipectusGreat parrotbill, Conostoma aemodiumBrown parrotbill, Cholornis unicolorGray-headed parrotbill, Psittiparus gularis (A)
Black-breasted parrotbill, Paradoxornis flavirostris (Ex)
Fulvous parrotbill, Suthora fulvifronsBlack-throated parrotbill, Suthora nipalensisWhite-eyes, yuhinas, and allies
Order: PasseriformesFamily: Zosteropidae

The white-eyes are small and mostly undistinguished, their plumage above being generally some dull color like greenish-olive, but some species have a white or bright yellow throat, breast or lower parts, and several have buff flanks. As their name suggests, many species have a white ring around each eye.

White-naped yuhina, Yuhina bakeriWhiskered yuhina, Yuhina flavicollisStripe-throated yuhina, Yuhina gularisRufous-vented yuhina, Yuhina occipitalisBlack-chinned yuhina, Yuhina nigrimentaIndian white-eye, Zosterops palpebrosusTree-babblers, scimitar-babblers, and allies
Order: PasseriformesFamily: Timaliidae

The babblers, or timaliids, are somewhat diverse in size and coloration, but have soft fluffy plumage.

Chestnut-capped babbler, Timalia pileataPin-striped tit-babbler, Mixornis gularisTawny-bellied babbler, Dumetia hyperythraGolden babbler, Cyanoderma chrysaeumBlack-chinned babbler, Cyanoderma pyrrhopsRufous-capped babbler, Cyanoderma ruficepsRufous-throated wren-babbler, Spelaeornis caudatusCoral-billed scimitar-babbler, Pomatorhinus ferruginosusSlender-billed scimitar-babbler, Pomatorhinus superciliarisStreak-breasted scimitar-babbler, Pomatorhinus ruficollisWhite-browed scimitar-babbler, Pomatorhinus schisticepsRusty-cheeked scimitar-babbler, Erythrogenys erythrogenysGray-throated babbler, Stachyris nigricepsGround babblers and allies
Order: PasseriformesFamily: Pellorneidae

These small to medium-sized songbirds have soft fluffy plumage but are otherwise rather diverse. Members of the genus Illadopsis are found in forests, but some other genera are birds of scrublands.

White-hooded babbler, Gampsorhynchus rufulusRufous-winged fulvetta, Schoeniparus castanecepsRufous-vented grass babbler, Laticilla burnesiiPuff-throated babbler, Pellorneum ruficepsLong-billed wren-babbler, Napothera malacoptila (A)
Abbott's babbler, Malacocincla abbottiIndian grassbird, Graminicola bengalensisLaughingthrushes and allies
Order: PasseriformesFamily: Leiothrichidae

The members of this family are diverse in size and colouration, though those of genus Turdoides tend to be brown or greyish. The family is found in Africa, India, and southeast Asia.

Nepal fulvetta, Alcippe nipalensisStriated laughingthrush, Grammatoptila striataHimalayan cutia, Cutia nipalensisSpiny babbler, Turdoides nipalensis (E)
Common babbler, Argya caudatusStriated babbler, Argya earleiSlender-billed babbler, Argya longirostrisLarge gray babbler, Argya malcolmiJungle babbler, Argya striataWhite-crested laughingthrush, Garrulax leucolophusLesser necklaced laughingthrush, Garrulax monilegerRufous-chinned laughingthrush, Ianthocincla rufogularisSpotted laughingthrush, Ianthocincla ocellataGreater necklaced laughingthrush, Ianthocincla pectoralisWhite-throated laughingthrush, Ianthocincla albogularisRufous-necked laughingthrush, Ianthocincla ruficollisGray-sided laughingthrush, Ianthocincla caerulataStreaked laughingthrush, Trochalopteron lineatumBhutan laughingthrush, Trochalopteron imbricatumScaly laughingthrush, Trochalopteron subunicolorBlue-winged laughingthrush, Trochalopteron squamatumVariegated laughingthrush, Trochalopteron variegatumBlack-faced laughingthrush, Trochalopteron affineChestnut-crowned laughingthrush, Trochalopteron erythrocephalumRufous sibia, Heterophasia capistrataLong-tailed sibia, Heterophasia picaoidesSilver-eared mesia, Leiothrix argentaurisRed-billed leiothrix, Leiothrix luteaRed-tailed minla, Minla ignotinctaRufous-backed sibia, Leioptila annectensRed-faced liocichla, Liocichla phoeniceaHoary-throated barwing, Actinodura nipalensisRusty-fronted barwing, Actinodura egertoniBlue-winged minla, Actinodura cyanouropteraChestnut-tailed minla, Actinodura strigulaKinglets
Order: PasseriformesFamily: Regulidae

The kinglets, also called crests, are a small group of birds often included in the Old World warblers, but frequently given family status because they also resemble the titmice.

Goldcrest, Regulus regulusWallcreeper
Order: PasseriformesFamily: Tichodromidae

The wallcreeper is a small bird related to the nuthatch family, which has stunning crimson, gray and black plumage.

Wallcreeper, Tichodroma murariaNuthatches
Order: PasseriformesFamily: Sittidae

Nuthatches are small woodland birds. They have the unusual ability to climb down trees head first, unlike other birds which can only go upwards. Nuthatches have big heads, short tails and powerful bills and feet.

Indian nuthatch, Sitta castaneaChestnut-bellied nuthatch, Sitta castaneaKashmir nuthatch, Sitta cashmirensisWhite-tailed nuthatch, Sitta himalayensisWhite-cheeked nuthatch, Sitta leucopsisVelvet-fronted nuthatch, Sitta frontalisTreecreepers
Order: PasseriformesFamily: Certhiidae

Treecreepers are small woodland birds, brown above and white below. They have thin pointed down-curved bills, which they use to extricate insects from bark. They have stiff tail feathers, like woodpeckers, which they use to support themselves on vertical trees.

Hodgson's treecreeper, Certhia hodgsoniBar-tailed treecreeper, Certhia himalayanaRusty-flanked treecreeper, Certhia nipalensisSikkim treecreeper, Certhia discolorWrens
Order: PasseriformesFamily: Troglodytidae

The wrens are mainly small and inconspicuous except for their loud songs. These birds have short wings and thin down-turned bills. Several species often hold their tails upright. All are insectivorous.

Eurasian wren, Troglodytes troglodytesSpotted elachura
Order: PasseriformesFamily: Elachuridae

This species, the only one in its family, inhabits forest undergrowth throughout South East Asia.

Spotted elachura, Elachura formosaDippers
Order: PasseriformesFamily: Cinclidae

Dippers are a group of perching birds whose habitat includes aquatic environments in the Americas, Europe and Asia. They are named for their bobbing or dipping movements.

White-throated dipper, Cinclus cinclusBrown dipper, Cinclus pallasiiStarlings
Order: PasseriformesFamily: Sturnidae

Starlings are small to medium-sized passerine birds. Their flight is strong and direct and they are very gregarious. Their preferred habitat is fairly open country. They eat insects and fruit. Plumage is typically dark with a metallic sheen.

Common hill myna, Gracula religiosaEuropean starling, Sturnus vulgarisRosy starling, Pastor roseus (A)
Daurian starling, Agropsar sturninus (A)
Indian pied starling, Gracupica contraBrahminy starling, Sturnia pagodarumChestnut-tailed starling, Sturnia malabaricaCommon myna, Acridotheres tristisBank myna, Acridotheres ginginianusJungle myna, Acridotheres fuscusSpot-winged starling, Saroglossa spilopterusThrushes and allies
Order: PasseriformesFamily: Turdidae

The thrushes are a group of passerine birds that occur mainly in the Old World. They are plump, soft plumaged, small to medium-sized insectivores or sometimes omnivores, often feeding on the ground. Many have attractive songs.

Grandala, Grandala coelicolorLong-tailed thrush, Zoothera dixoniAlpine thrush, Zoothera mollissimaHimalayan thrush, Zoothera salimaliiDark-sided thrush, Zoothera marginataLong-billed thrush, Zoothera monticolaScaly thrush, Zoothera daumaPurple cochoa, Cochoa purpureaGreen cochoa, Cochoa viridis (A)
Pied thrush, Geokichla wardiiOrange-headed thrush, Geokichla citrinaMistle thrush, Turdus viscivorusEurasian blackbird, Turdus merula (A)
Gray-winged blackbird, Turdus boulboulIndian blackbird, Turdus simillimusTickell's thrush, Turdus unicolorBlack-breasted thrush, Turdus dissimilis (A)
Gray-sided thrush, Turdus feae (A)
Eyebrowed thrush, Turdus obscurusWhite-backed thrush, Turdus kessleriTibetan blackbird, Turdus maximusWhite-collared blackbird, Turdus albocinctusChestnut thrush, Turdus rubrocanusBlack-throated thrush, Turdus atrogularisRed-throated thrush, Turdus ruficollisDusky thrush, Turdus eunomusOld World flycatchers
Order: PasseriformesFamily: Muscicapidae

Old World flycatchers are a large group of small passerine birds native to the Old World. They are mainly small arboreal insectivores. The appearance of these birds is highly varied, but they mostly have weak songs and harsh calls.

Dark-sided flycatcher, Muscicapa sibiricaFerruginous flycatcher, Muscicapa ferrugineaAsian brown flycatcher, Muscicapa dauuricaBrown-breasted flycatcher, Muscicapa muttui (A)
Indian robin, Copsychus fulicatusOriental magpie-robin, Copsychus saularisWhite-rumped shama, Copsychus malabaricusWhite-gorgeted flycatcher, Anthipes monilegerPale-chinned blue flycatcher, Cyornis poliogenysPale blue flycatcher, Cyornis unicolorBlue-throated flycatcher, Cyornis rubeculoidesLarge blue flycatcher, Cyornis magnirostrisTickell's blue flycatcher, Cyornis tickelliaeLarge niltava, Niltava grandisSmall niltava, Niltava macgrigoriaeRufous-bellied niltava, Niltava sundaraVerditer flycatcher, Eumyias thalassinusGould's shortwing, Brachypteryx stellataLesser shortwing, Brachypteryx leucophrysHimalayan shortwing, Brachypteryx cruralisIndian blue robin, Larvivora brunneaSiberian blue robin, Larvivora cyane (A)
White-bellied redstart, Luscinia phaenicuroidesBluethroat, Luscinia svecicaBlue whistling-thrush, Myophonus caeruleusLittle forktail, Enicurus scouleriSpotted forktail, Enicurus maculatusBlack-backed forktail, Enicurus immaculatusSlaty-backed forktail, Enicurus schistaceusSiberian rubythroat, Calliope calliopeHimalayan rubythroat, Calliope pectoralisChinese rubythroat, Calliope tschebaiewiWhite-tailed robin, Myiomela leucuraHimalayan bluetail, Tarsiger rufilatusRufous-breasted bush-robin, Tarsiger hyperythrusWhite-browed bush-robin, Tarsiger indicusGolden bush-robin, Tarsiger chrysaeusSlaty-backed flycatcher, Ficedula erithacusSlaty-blue flycatcher, Ficedula tricolorSnowy-browed flycatcher, Ficedula hyperythraPygmy flycatcher, Ficedula hodgsoniRufous-gorgeted flycatcher, Ficedula strophiataSapphire flycatcher, Ficedula sapphiraLittle pied flycatcher, Ficedula westermanniUltramarine flycatcher, Ficedula superciliarisRusty-tailed flycatcher, Ficedula ruficaudaTaiga flycatcher, Ficedula albicillaKashmir flycatcher, Ficedula subrubra (A)
Red-breasted flycatcher, Ficedula parva (A)
Blue-fronted redstart, Phoenicurus frontalisPlumbeous redstart, Phoenicurus fuliginosusRufous-backed redstart, Phoenicurus erythronotaWhite-capped redstart, Phoenicurus leucocephalusBlue-capped redstart, Phoenicurus caeruleocephalusHodgson's redstart, Phoenicurus hodgsoniWhite-throated redstart, Phoenicurus schisticepsWhite-winged redstart, Phoenicurus erythrogasterBlack redstart, Phoenicurus ochrurosDaurian redstart, Phoenicurus auroreus (A)
Chestnut-bellied rock-thrush, Monticola rufiventrisBlue-capped rock-thrush, Monticola cinclorhynchaRufous-tailed rock-thrush, Monticola saxatilis (A)
Blue rock-thrush, Monticola solitariusWhite-throated bushchat, Saxicola insignisSiberian stonechat, Saxicola maurusWhite-tailed stonechat, Saxicola leucurusPied bushchat, Saxicola caprataJerdon's bushchat, Saxicola jerdoni (A)
Gray bushchat, Saxicola ferreusNorthern wheatear, Oenanthe oenanthe (A)
Isabelline wheatear, Oenanthe isabellinaDesert wheatear, Oenanthe desertiPied wheatear, Oenanthe pleschankaBrown rock chat, Oenanthe fuscaVariable wheatear, Oenanthe picataPersian wheatear, Oenanthe chrysopygia (A)

Waxwings
Order: PasseriformesFamily: Bombycillidae

The waxwings are a group of birds with soft silky plumage and unique red tips to some of the wing feathers. In the Bohemian and cedar waxwings, these tips look like sealing wax and give the group its name. These are arboreal birds of northern forests. They live on insects in summer and berries in winter.

Bohemian waxwing, Bombycilla garrulus (A)

Flowerpeckers
Order: PasseriformesFamily: Dicaeidae

The flowerpeckers are very small, stout, often brightly colored birds, with short tails, short thick curved bills and tubular tongues.

Thick-billed flowerpecker, Dicaeum agileYellow-vented flowerpecker, Dicaeum chrysorrheumYellow-bellied flowerpecker, Dicaeum melanozanthumPale-billed flowerpecker, Dicaeum erythrorhynchosPlain flowerpecker, Dicaeum minullumFire-breasted flowerpecker, Dicaeum ignipectusScarlet-backed flowerpecker, Dicaeum cruentatumSunbirds and spiderhunters
Order: PasseriformesFamily: Nectariniidae

The sunbirds and spiderhunters are very small passerine birds which feed largely on nectar, although they will also take insects, especially when feeding young. Flight is fast and direct on their short wings. Most species can take nectar by hovering like a hummingbird, but usually perch to feed.

Ruby-cheeked sunbird, Chalcoparia singalensisPurple sunbird, Cinnyris asiaticusFire-tailed sunbird, Aethopyga ignicaudaBlack-throated sunbird, Aethopyga saturataMrs. Gould's sunbird, Aethopyga gouldiaeGreen-tailed sunbird, Aethopyga nipalensisCrimson sunbird, Aethopyga siparajaLittle spiderhunter, Arachnothera longirostraStreaked spiderhunter, Arachnothera magnaFairy-bluebirds
Order: PasseriformesFamily: Irenidae

The fairy-bluebirds are bulbul-like birds of open forest or thorn scrub. The males are dark-blue and the females a duller green.

Asian fairy-bluebird, Irena puellaLeafbirds
Order: PasseriformesFamily: Chloropseidae

The leafbirds are small, bulbul-like birds. The males are brightly plumaged, usually in greens and yellows.

Golden-fronted leafbird, Chloropsis aurifronsOrange-bellied leafbird, Chloropsis hardwickiiWeavers and allies
Order: PasseriformesFamily: Ploceidae

The weavers are small passerine birds related to the finches. They are seed-eating birds with rounded conical bills. The males of many species are brightly colored, usually in red or yellow and black, some species show variation in color only in the breeding season.

Streaked weaver, Ploceus manyarBaya weaver, Ploceus philippinusFinn's weaver, Ploceus megarhynchus (A)
Black-breasted weaver, Ploceus benghalensisWaxbills and allies
Order: PasseriformesFamily: Estrildidae

The estrildid finches are small passerine birds of the Old World tropics and Australasia. They are gregarious and often colonial seed eaters with short thick but pointed bills. They are all similar in structure and habits, but have wide variation in plumage colors and patterns.

Red avadavat, Amandava amandavaIndian silverbill, Euodice malabaricaWhite-rumped munia, Lonchura striataScaly-breasted munia, Lonchura punctulataTricolored munia, Lonchura malaccaChestnut munia, Lonchura atricapillaAccentors
Order: PasseriformesFamily: Prunellidae

The accentors are in the only bird family, Prunellidae, which is completely endemic to the Palearctic. They are small, fairly drab species superficially similar to sparrows.

Alpine accentor, Prunella collarisAltai accentor, Prunella himalayanaRobin accentor, Prunella rubeculoidesRufous-breasted accentor, Prunella strophiataBrown accentor, Prunella fulvescensBlack-throated accentor, Prunella atrogularisMaroon-backed accentor, Prunella immaculataOld World sparrows
Order: PasseriformesFamily: Passeridae

Old World sparrows are small passerine birds. In general, sparrows tend to be small, plump, brown or gray birds with short tails and short powerful beaks. Sparrows are seed eaters, but they also consume small insects.

House sparrow, Passer domesticusSpanish sparrow, Passer hispaniolensis (A)
Russet sparrow, Passer cinnamomeus (A)
Eurasian tree sparrow, Passer montanusYellow-throated sparrow, Gymnoris xanthocollisBlack-winged snowfinch, Montifringilla adamsiWhite-rumped snowfinch, Montifringilla taczanowskiiRufous-necked snowfinch, Montifringilla ruficollisBlanford's snowfinch, Montifringilla blanfordiWagtails and pipits
Order: PasseriformesFamily: Motacillidae

Motacillidae is a family of small passerine birds with medium to long tails. They include the wagtails, longclaws and pipits. They are slender, ground feeding insectivores of open country.

Forest wagtail, Dendronanthus indicus (A)
Gray wagtail, Motacilla cinereaWestern yellow wagtail, Motacilla flava 
Eastern yellow wagtail, Motacilla tschutschensis (A)
Citrine wagtail, Motacilla citreolaWhite-browed wagtail, Motacilla maderaspatensisWhite wagtail, Motacilla albaRichard's pipit, Anthus richardiPaddyfield pipit, Anthus rufulusLong-billed pipit, Anthus similisBlyth's pipit, Anthus godlewskiiTawny pipit, Anthus campestris (A)
Upland pipit, Anthus sylvanusRosy pipit, Anthus roseatusTree pipit, Anthus trivialisOlive-backed pipit, Anthus hodgsoniRed-throated pipit, Anthus cervinusWater pipit, Anthus spinoletta (A)
American pipit, Anthus rubescensFinches, euphonias, and allies
Order: PasseriformesFamily: Fringillidae

Finches are seed-eating passerine birds, that are small to moderately large and have a strong beak, usually conical and in some species very large. All have twelve tail feathers and nine primaries. These birds have a bouncing flight with alternating bouts of flapping and gliding on closed wings, and most sing well.

Common chaffinch, Fringilla coelebsBrambling, Fringilla montifringillaBlack-and-yellow grosbeak, Mycerobas icterioidesCollared grosbeak, Mycerobas affinisSpot-winged grosbeak, Mycerobas melanozanthosWhite-winged grosbeak, Mycerobas carnipesCommon rosefinch, Carpodacus erythrinusScarlet finch, Carpodacus sipahiHimalayan beautiful rosefinch, Carpodacus pulcherrimusDark-rumped rosefinch, Carpodacus edwardsiiPink-browed rosefinch, Carpodacus rhodochrousSpot-winged rosefinch, Carpodacus rhodopeplusVinaceous rosefinch, Carpodacus vinaceusStreaked rosefinch, Carpodacus rubicilloidesGreat rosefinch, Carpodacus rubicillaRed-fronted rosefinch, Carpodacus puniceusCrimson-browed finch, Carpodacus subhimachalusThree-banded rosefinch, Carpodacus trifasciatus (A)
Himalayan white-browed rosefinch, Carpodacus thuraBrown bullfinch, Pyrrhula nipalensisRed-headed bullfinch, Pyrrhula erythrocephalaGray-headed bullfinch, Pyrrhula erythaca (A)
Mongolian finch, Bucanetes mongolicus (A)
Blanford's rosefinch, Agraphospiza rubescensGolden-naped finch, Pyrrhoplectes epaulettaSpectacled finch, Callacanthis burtoniDark-breasted rosefinch, Procarduelis nipalensisPlain mountain finch, Leucosticte nemoricolaBlack-headed mountain finch, Leucosticte brandtiYellow-breasted greenfinch, Chloris spinoidesTwite, Linaria flavirostrisEurasian linnet, Linaria cannabina (A)
Red crossbill, Loxia curvirostraEuropean goldfinch, Carduelis carduelisFire-fronted serin, Serinus pusillusTibetan serin, Serinus thibetanusEurasian siskin, Spinus spinus (A)

Old World buntings
Order: PasseriformesFamily: Emberizidae

The emberizids are a large family of passerine birds. They are seed-eating birds with distinctively shaped bills. Many emberizid species have distinctive head patterns.

Crested bunting, Emberiza lathamiBlack-headed bunting, Emberiza melanocephala (A)
Red-headed bunting, Emberiza bruniceps (A)
Chestnut-eared bunting, Emberiza fucataRock bunting, Emberiza ciaGodlewski's bunting, Emberiza godlewskiiWhite-capped bunting, Emberiza stewarti (A)
Yellowhammer, Emberiza citrinellaPine bunting, Emberiza leucocephalosGray-necked bunting, Emberiza buchanani (A)
Striolated bunting, Emberiza striolata (A)
Reed bunting, Emberiza schoeniclus (A)
Yellow-breasted bunting, Emberiza aureolaLittle bunting, Emberiza pusillaRustic bunting, Emberiza rustica (A)
Black-faced bunting, Emberiza spodocephalaChestnut bunting, Emberiza rutila'' (A)

See also
List of birds
Lists of birds by region

References

 
 

Nepal
Nepal
 
Birds